Jacques Abady QC (2 October 1872 – 15 April 1964) was a British lawyer.

Early life
Born on 2 October 1872, into a Jewish family, Abady was educated at Manchester Grammar School and the Birkbeck Institute. His first vocation was as an engineer, becoming a Member of the Institute of Mechanical Engineering and inventing several scientific instruments.

Legal career
Later, Abady decided to pursue a legal career, and was called to the bar by the Middle Temple in 1905. He became a bencher of the Middle Temple in 1941. He was a member of Westminster City Council between 1906 and 1912, and then again from 1916 to 1959, also serving as the Mayor of Westminster in 1927–1928.

Death
Abady died in Sussex on 15 April 1964, at the age of 91.

Personal life
Abady had one son with his wife. In his spare time, Abady enjoyed writing thrillers and plays. He was a member of the Hurlingham Club and the Constitutional Club.

References

1872 births
1964 deaths
British Jewish writers
20th-century British novelists
20th-century British dramatists and playwrights
20th-century British lawyers
British male novelists
British thriller writers
Councillors in the City of Westminster
British male dramatists and playwrights
Mayors of places in Greater London
Members of the Middle Temple
People educated at Manchester Grammar School
20th-century British male writers
20th-century British writers
Alumni of Birkbeck, University of London
19th-century British engineers